417 Combat Support Squadron is an Air Force unit with the Canadian Forces. Based at CFB Cold Lake it provides helicopter support to the base operations. Since 1994, it has also provided search and rescue.

History
417 Squadron was a Royal Canadian Air Force squadron formed in England on 27 November 1941 at RAF Charmy Down and was known as the "City of Windsor" squadron. It was equipped with the Hurricane and later the Spitfire. It was initially deployed in Egypt and followed the Allied advance through the Western Desert. On 10 July 1943 when the Allies invaded Sicily (Operation Husky), the squadron was part of No. 244 Wing RAF in No. 211 Group RAF.

With the defeat of Axis forces in North Africa, the squadron followed the advance through Italy. It disbanded in Italy on 1 July 1945.

The squadron reactivated in Canada on 1 June 1947, at Rivers, Manitoba. It was equipped with the North American P-51 Mustang for army close support training until 1 August 1948.

Reformed as a part of the Canadian Forces in 1970 it operated as an operational training squadron on the Lockheed CF-104 Starfighter at CFB Cold Lake. The squadron disbanded in 1983 with the retirement of the CF-104 fleet.

On 1 April 1993, No 417 Combat Support squadron was formed from CFB Cold Lake Base Flight plus aircraft servicing and maintenance elements of the Wing Maintenance organization. The squadron continued Base Flight's operations with ten Canadair CT-133 Silver Star and three CH-118 Iroquois. When Base Rescue Moose Jaw was disbanded in 1993, 417 Squadron gained two of their CH-118s, to operate a total of five.

In July 1995 417 Squadron received three CH-146 Griffon helicopters and the five CH-118s were retired. The CT-133 was retired in 2001.

Images

Badges

Cadets
417 Squadron is affiliated with 395 Edmonton "Griffon" Squadron Royal Canadian Air Cadets, in Edmonton, Alberta. This affiliation began in 1993, with annual "Griffon Coin Parades" being hosted every year between the two units.

References

External links 

Canada's Air Force:  417 "City of Windsor" Combat Support Squadron

Royal Canadian Air Force squadrons
Canadian Forces aircraft squadrons